Stanisław Bonifacy Jundziłł or, in Lithuanian, Stanislovas Bonifacas Jundzilas (6 May 1761 in Jasiańce, Voranava District – 15 April 1847 in Vilnius) was a Polish-Lithuanian priest, botanist, educator and diarist who lectured at the University of Vilnius.

Biography 

He was born into an impoverished noble family and did his best to get an education on his own, but was not able to go to school until 1774, when his father married for a third time and received a very generous dowry. From 1774 to 1779, he attended schools operated by the Piarists. It was during this period that he became nearly blind in his right eye.

With no money or career connections, he joined the Piarist order. After completing his religious vows, he taught a variety of subjects at their schools in Raseiniai and Vilnius through 1786. He then continued his own studies in chemistry and botany with Georg Forster and Jean-Emmanuel Gilibert, and helped create a botanical garden at the university.

In 1792, he received a scholar's grant that enabled him to study abroad. He travelled throughout Eastern and Central Europe until 1794, when his grant was discontinued after the Second Partition of Poland. However, he was able to obtain financial assistance from Count Ignacy Potocki and Princess Izabela Czartoryska, so he remained in Vienna for a while, organizing a garden of medicinal plants at the University of Veterinary Medicine while continuing to study a wide range of subjects.

He returned to Vilnius in 1797 and, in 1800, took his doctorate in Theology. This enabled him to become a professor of botany and zoology at the university in 1802. He retired in 1824 and spent much of his time travelling.

In his later years, he came into conflict with the new teachers at the university, criticizing their cosmopolitanism and lack of patriotism and predicting that their activities would have serious consequences; a prediction that came true when the university was closed by the Russian government in 1832. After that, saddened by the slow destruction of his beloved botanical garden, his health worsened and he eventually went totally blind.

Scientific and pedagogical activity 
He was one of the first to teach veterinary medicine in Lithuania and was the author of several basic textbooks on botany and zoology. His studies of migratory birds were among the earliest in that area.

He was also the author of the first scientifically precise description of the flora and fauna of Lithuania, based on the classificatory system of Carl Linnaeus, and won a gold medal for his work Botanika stosowana (Applied Botany).

Botanical nomenclature 
Genera
(Brassicaceae) Jundzillia Andrz. ex DC. Syst. Nat. Candolle 2: 529 1821 (IK), classed as a synonym of Lepidium 
(Stemonitidaceae)Jundzillia  Arch. Naturwiss. Landesdurchf. Böhmen 7(5): 45. 1893, classed as a synonym of Amaurochaete 
Species
(Caryophyllaceae) Silene jundzillii Zapał. Bull. Acad. Cracovie 1911, B 287; Consp. Fl. Galic. Crit. iii 197 (IK) 
(Rosaceae) Potentilla jundzilliana Błocki ex Th.Wolf Biblioth. Bot. lxxi. III 354 nomen. 1908 (IK) 
(Rosaceae) Rosa jundzillii Besser Cat. Hort. Cremeneci 1816 117 (IK)

References

Further reading 
 Antoni Marian Kurpiel (ed.), Pamiętniki ks. Stanisława Jundziłła profesora Uniw. Wileńskiego (selections from his diaries), Akademii Umiejętności, 1905
 Witold Sławiński, X. Stanisław Bonifacy Jundziłł, profesor historii naturalnej Wszechnicy Wileńskiej (monograph), Maria Curie-Skłodowska University, Lublin 1947

External links

 Wanda Grębecka, Stanisław Bonifacy Jundziłł, biography, chronology and bibliography Online @ Pawet

1761 births
1847 deaths
18th-century Polish botanists
People from Voranava District
19th-century Polish botanists
Belarusian philosophers
19th-century Polish philosophers
Academic staff of Vilnius University
Burials at Bernardine Cemetery